Multi_Viral is the fifth studio album from Puerto Rican band Calle 13, released on March 1, 2014. It marks the band's debut release via their new independent label, El Abismo, since they parted ways with Sony Music Latin. The album won Best Urban Music Album at the 15th Annual Latin Grammy Awards and Best Latin Rock or Alternative Album at 57th Annual Grammy Awards.

Recording and release 
The album was mixed at Electric Lady Studios, in Greenwich Village, New York City.

During the recording of the album in San Juan, Visitante saw the light bulbs in the studio burning out one by one as the months passed. He promised not to replace any of them until the album was finished. The last lamp burned one week before the album was ready, and Visitante said he would continue to work in the dark.

The album was released on March 1, 2014, coinciding with the band's debut performance of their South American tour at the Estadio Arquitecto Ricardo Etcheverry in Buenos Aires, Argentina. Every attendee of the tour received a digital download card for the album. This is part of the "multiviral" concept of the album, as the band's composer and instrumentalist Visitante explains:

Vocalist and lyricist Residente added that the album will be promoted not by traditional advertising but by word of mouth, virally.

On February 27, NPR Music made the entire album available for listening via streaming.

Music and lyrics
Residente has described the lyrics of the album as "more existential" and went on to say: "Suddenly, I've started to be more aware, or worried, about living and dying. I thought, maybe I can do something bigger than politics".

The album opening track was described by Jon Pareles as "an elegant chamber-pop setting, with hints of Beatles harmony". It will feature spoken words by Uruguayan writer Eduardo Galeano.

The track "Adentro" criticizes gangsta rappers and their lyrics, considered aggressive by Residente but also shows Residente apologizing for insulting Luis Fortuño, then governor of Puerto Rico, during a 2009 speech. Working further on self-criticism, Residente mentions a Maserati he bought during Calle 13 first successful years, something he later regretted. So much that the video for the song features Residente smashing the car, not before the "gangsta-influenced Puerto Rican youth" throw their guns and gold through its open windows onto the seats. Residente destroyed the car using a baseball bat provided by Willie Mays, a hero to Residente. Commenting on the idea of the song and the video, Residente said:

When Visitante studied the concept of the song, he tried not to use typical hip hop rhythms and loops. A set of Grammy Awards trophies was used for percussion at some parts of the song.

The title-track and first single covers the topic of media manipulation and disinformation while referencing protests such as Occupy Wall Street and Yo Soy 132.

The track "Ojos Color Sol", which is the third single, is a collaboration with Cuban songwriter Silvio Rodríguez, an influence of Residente's. The song expresses the idea that the sunlight would not be missed because the look of a woman is as bright as the star's light.

The second single, "El Aguante", features a "brisk Irish-flavored flute melody". It is influenced by Ireland's resistance to assimilation and mentions several other historical conflicts, wars and dictatorships. The chorus of the song was sung by Residente and a group of people. Some sections of the song have percussive sounds that were produced by Residente, Visitante and a third man hitting bottles on a wooden plate with several metallic objects on it.

"Respira el momento" (The original name was "La vida" but as Residente said "They were a lot of songs just coming out with that name so we changed it") talks about the cycle of a human life. The chorus is built on a Native American chant. They invited Native American singer Vernon Foster, whom they discovered on YouTube, but he was in Romania at the time. They had him fly to San Juan anyway. Visitante said the song reflected the way he felt during the preparing of the album, saying it was the first song to be thought of and the last to be finished. Residente said it was difficult to write a song that summarized life, and that he did some research on data such as how many people are born and die every day, month and year; how much one walks during a lifetime, etc. A string quartet guest appeared on this track. The song's tempo was intended to match that of a baby's heartbeat.

Reception and accolades 

Will Hermes of Rolling Stone said the band "have made as ambitious a hip-hop album – if that's not too narrow a term – as any in any language", and considered the title track, as well as the whole album, "an object lesson in just that." David Jeffries from AllMusic said the album kept the "political commentary" and "genre-jumping" while showing a "sense of earned artistic freedom". He also commented that "it's amazing the album doesn't fall apart because of weight, or come off like a dry civics class".

Multi_Viral and its songs received ten nominations for the Latin Grammy Awards of 2014 - the same number of their previous studio release, Entren Los Que Quieran. The album itself was nominated for Album of the Year and Best Urban Music Album. The third single "Adentro" was nominated for three categories: Best Urban Performance, Best Urban Song (to which "Cuando los pies besan el piso" was also nominated) and Best Short Form Music Video. The second single ("El Aguante") and the fourth single ("Ojos Color de Sol") were also nominated for Best Alternative Song and Song of the Year, respectively, and "Respira el Momento" was nominated for Record of the Year. The band's producer and instrumentalist Visitante was nominated for Producer of the Year, not only for his work on this album, but also for producing Jorge Drexler's "Todo Cae".

In 2015, the album won the Grammy Award for Best Latin Rock, Urban or Alternative Album. Also in 2015, the videos for the tracks "Así de grande son las ideas" and "Ojos color de sol" were nominated for the 16th Latin Grammy Awards in the Best Short Form Music Video category.

Track listing

Charts

Weekly charts

Year-end charts

Certifications

References

2014 albums
Calle 13 (band) albums
Grammy Award for Best Latin Rock, Urban or Alternative Album
Latin Grammy Award for Best Urban Music Album
Articles with underscores in the title